Posey Field is an unincorporated community  located in Winston County, Alabama, United States. The community was founded c. 1950 and has a population of 74.

Posey Field Airport
The Posey Field Airport is located in the community. The airport was named after a former Winston County politician.

Religion
Two churches are located within the Posey Mills community, Posey Mills Baptist Church and Sunny Home Baptist Church.

Services
The Posey Field community is located within Winston County, therefore county garbage pickup is provided. The community is served by the Haleyville Fire Department as well as the Pebble Volunteer Fire Department.

Some of the community is also in Franklin County, including Posey Mill Baptist Church and adjoining cemetery.

Notable people
Pat Buttram, Green Acres star
Jake Hess, gospel musician

Unincorporated communities in Winston County, Alabama
Unincorporated communities in Alabama